Mogwa-cha or quince tea is a traditional Korean tea made with Chinese quince. Most commonly, mogwa-cha is prepared by mixing hot water with mogwa-cheong (quince preserved in honey or sugar). Alternatively, it can also be made by boiling dried quince in water or mixing powdered dried quince with hot water.

See also 
 Traditional Korean tea

References 

Condiments
Herbal tea
Korean tea
Traditional Korean medicine